Barss is a surname. Notable people with the surname include:

James Barss (1782–1863), Canadian politician
John Barss (1778–1851), Canadian politician
Joseph Barss (1776–1824), Canadian privateer
Joseph Barss (ice hockey) (1892–1971), Canadian ice hockey player and coach
Joseph Barss (politician) (1750–1826), Canadian politician